The 1958 season was the 53rd season of competitive football in Norway.

1957–58 league season

Hovedserien

Group A

Group B

Landsdelsserien

Group Østland/Søndre

Group Østland/Nordre

Group Sørland/Vestland, A1

Group Sørland/Vestland, A2

Group Sørland/Vestland, B

Group Møre

Group Trøndelag

Play-off Sørland/Vestland
 Jerv - Stavanger 3-2 
 Jerv - Årstad 0-2 
 Årstad promoted.

Play-off Møre/Trøndelag
 Freidig - Kristiansund 3-1 
 Kristiansund - Freidig 2-3 (agg. 3-6) 
 Freidig promoted.

Third Division

District I
 1. Sprint/Jeløy Promoted 
 2. Torp 
 3. Kråkerøy 
 4. Tune 
 5. Mysen 
 6. Hafslund 
 7. Østsiden 
 8. Rakkestad

District II, group A
 1. Åssiden Play-off 
 2. Drammens BK 
 3. Røa 
 4. Spartacus 
 5. Geithus 
 6. Slemmestad 
 7. Jevnaker 
 8. Sterling

District II, group B
 1. Sagene Play-off 
 2. Aurskog 
 3. Grue 
 4. Furuset 
 5. Sørli 
 6. Bjørkelangen 
 7. Lillestrøm/Fram 
 8. Grüner

District III, group A (Oplandene)
 1. Lena Play-off 
 2. Mesna 
 3. Hamar IL 
 4. Brumunddal 
 5. Hamarkameratene 
 6. Vardal 
 7. Vang 
 8. Skreia

District III, group B (Sør-Østerdal)
 1. Koppang Play-off 
 2. Innsats 
 3. Elverum 
 4. Lørdalen 
 5. Engerdal 
 6. Nybergsund 
 7. Ytre Rendal

District IV, group A (Vestfold)
 1. Ørn Play-off 
 2. Falk 
 3. Runar 
 4. Sem 
 5. Holmestrand 
 6. Tønsbergkam. 
 7. Teie 
 8. Stag

District IV, group B (Grenland)
 1. Pors Play-off 
 2. Skiens-Grane 
 3. Urædd 
 4. Storm 
 5. Herkules 
 6. Kragerø 
 7. Skiens BK 
 8. Gjerpen

District IV, group C (Øvre Telemark)
 1. Rjukan Play-off 
 2. Snøgg 
 3. Skade 
 4. Ulefoss 
 5. Drangedal 
 6. Skarphedin

District V, group A1 (Aust-Agder)
 1. Nedenes Play-off 
 2. Rygene 
 3. Dristug 
 4. Risør 
 5. Trauma 
 6. Froland

District V, group A2 (Vest-Agder)
 1. Vigør Play-off 
 2. Mandalskam. 
 3. Vindbjart 
 4. Farsund 
 5. Våg 
 6. AIK Lund withdrew

District V, group B1 (Rogaland)
 1. Nærbø Promoted 
 2. Varhaug 
 3. Klepp 
 4. Vaulen 
 5. Randaberg 
 6. Riska

District V, group B2 (Rogaland)
 1. Haugar Promoted 
 2. Vidar 
 3. Kopervik 
 4. Buøy 
 5. Åkra 
 6. Torvastad

District VI, group A (Bergen)
 1. Nymark Play-off 
 2. Djerv 
 3. Laksevåg 
 4. Trane 
 5. Bergens-Sparta 
 6. Fjellkameratene 
 7. Minde

District VI, group B (Midthordland)
 1. Fana Play-off 
 2. Voss 
 3. Follese 
 4. Erdal 
 5. Florvåg 
 6. Ålvik 
 7. Arna

District VII, group A (Sunnmøre)
 1. Volda Play-off 
 2. Skarbøvik 
 3. Herd 
 4. Ørsta 
 5. Velled./Ringen 
 6. Aksla 
 7. Sykkylven 
 8. Hovdebygda

District VII, group B (Romsdal)
 1. Åndalsnes Play-off 
 2. Eidsvåg (Romsdal) 
 3. Nord-Gossen 
 4. Træff 
 5. Eide 
 6. Isfjorden 
 7. Måndalen withdrew

District VII, group C (Sunnmøre)
 1. Dahle Play-off 
 2. Framtid 
 3. Nordlandet 
 4. Goma 
 5. Sunndal 
 6. Halsa 
 7. Vågen 
 8. Valsøyfjorden withdrew

District VIII, group A1 (Sør-Trøndelag)
 1. Ranheim Play-off 
 2. Flå 
 3. Heimdal 
 4. Melhus 
 5. Støren 
 6. Selbu

District VIII, group A2 (Nord-Trøndelag)
 1. Orkanger Play-off 
 2. Løkken 
 3. Troll 
 4. Svorkmo 
 5. Rindal 
 6. Dalguten withdrew

District VIII, group B (Trondheim og omegn)
 1. Falken Play-off 
 2. Tryggkameratene 
 3. Trondheims/Ørn 
 4. National 
 5. Trond 
 6. Nidelv 
 7. Wing 
 8. NTHI

District VIII, group C (Fosen)
 1. Opphaug Play-off 
 2. Fevåg 
 3. Beian 
 4. Stadsbygd 
 5. Hasselvika 
 6. Uthaug 
 7. Lensvik withdrew

District VIII, group D (Nord-Trøndelag/Namdal)
 1. Neset Play-off '
 2. Bangsund 
 3. Namsos 
 4. Fram (Skatval) 
 5. Snåsa 
 6. Malm 
 7. Leksvik 
 8. Varden (Meråker) withdrew

District IX
 1. Mo 
 2. Bodø/Glimt 
 3. Brønnøysund 
 4. Stålkameratene 
 5. Mosjøen 
 6. Fauske/Sprint

District X (Unofficial)
 1. Harstad 
 2. Narvik/Nor 
 3. Tromsø 
 4. Mjølner 
 5. Bardufoss/Omegn 
 6. Finnsnes

Play-off District II
 Sagene - Åssiden 2-2 
 Åssiden - Sagene 1-4 (agg. 3-6) 
 Sagene promoted.

Play-off District III
 Lena - Koppang 9-1 
 Koppang - Lena 2-6 (agg. 3-15) 
 Lena promoted.

Play-off District IV
 Rjukan - Pors 1-3 
 Pors - Ørn 3-0 
 Ørn - Rjukan 4-1

Play-off District V
 Nedenes - Vigør 2-0 
 Vigør - Nedenes 2-3 (agg. 2-5) 
 Nedenes promoted.

Championship District V
 Nærbø - Haugar 2-2 
 Haugar - Nærbø 0-0 (agg. 2-2) 
 Nærbø - Haugar 2-2 (extra time)
 Haugar - Nærbø 2-0 
 Nedenes - Haugar not played

Play-off District VI
 Fana - Nymark 1-0 
 Nymark - Fana 1-0 (agg. 1-1) 
 Fana - Nymark 1-2 Nymark promoted.

Play-off District VII
 Volda - Dahle 3-1 
 Dahle - Åndalsnes 3-0 
 Åndalsnes - Volda 0-5

Play-off District VIII
 Ranheim - Orkanger? 
 Opphaug - Neset 0-2 
 Ranheim - Falken 1-4 
 Ranheim - Opphaug 2-4 
 Falken - Neset 3-3 
 Neset - Ranheim 4-0 
 Falken - Opphaug 2-1

National Cup

Final

Northern Norwegian Cup

Final

National team

Note: Norway's goals first

References

  
Seasons in Norwegian football